The Holden 48-215 is a mid-size sedan which was produced by the Australian automaker Holden between November 1948 and October 1953. A coupe utility derivative, coded as the 50-2106 and marketed as the Holden Coupe Utility, was produced from January 1951.

The 48-215 was the first model from General Motors in Australia to bear the Holden name. In mainstream parlance, the official name of "Holden 48-215" was eschewed in favour of the shortened "Holden" designation. Following the replacement of the first Holden, the 48-215 gained the unofficial nickname of Holden FX. This designation was first used in the Drawing Office at GM-H in 1952 as an unofficial means of distinguishing between early 48-215 vehicles with front suspension using lever-action shock absorbers, and those with the new telescopic shock absorber front suspension introduced in 1953 - the term "FX" was pencilled onto a parts list for the new suspension components. The title "FX" later came into use in used car advertisements to describe models with the later suspension, first being used by Melbourne dealer Reg Smith Motors in two advertisements in the 10 February 1960 issue of The Age. Use of the term "FX" gradually spread to cover all 48-215 and 50-2106 vehicles, although the term has never been used by Holden in any official manner.

The design was originally conceived in the United States by Chevrolet, but was not used because it was deemed too small for the U.S. market as it developed after the war. Instead the design became the basis of only the 48-215 model. Its American origins are quite apparent, as it closely resembles Chevrolets of the period that did make it to production, particularly the Fleetline Aerosedan and the second generation Deluxe. Development of the 48-215 began in 1944.

Five prototypes 

Three prototypes were built by hand in 1946 by American and Australian engineers at the General Motors workshop in Detroit. Months of durability and performance testing were undergone in the US before the three prototypes were shipped to Australia. Prototype number one was first registered (as a Chevrolet) in Victoria as JP-480 on 12 February 1947. It survives as part of the National Museum of Australia collection. Prototypes two and three were registered at the same time as JP-481 and JP-482.

A further two prototypes were built in Australia; the first was registered as KJ-400. Owned by Australian businessman Peter Briggs between 1980 and 2013, the car's value was estimated to be worth over  when it was put up for auction in the Motorclassica auction Melbourne, in October 2013. The second Australian-built prototype was registered as KY-442. All five prototypes were registered as Chevrolets.

Only two were used for photographic purposes. They were:
 Prototype No.1, JP-480, dark colour—Seine Blue (not Cadillac Blue)
 Prototype No.4, KY-442, light colour—Gawler Cream.

In the absence of an established supplier base in Australia for auto-making, new forging facilities had to be set up for producing crankshafts and a new foundry was set up for major castings. In order to hasten the project to production some simplifications were incorporated. There were no direction indicators, there was no provision for heating or demisting, and at the rear there was only a single, centrally positioned, tail lamp. Because of the mild climate in most of the populated areas of the country, it was found possible to save weight and cost by using a relatively small 6-volt 11-plate battery. Interior trim was minimised: weight reduction was pursued "with great vigour" and, in view of the  weight in "running trim", a success.

Ten pilot cars

1948 timeline 
 April, the production plant at Woodville, South Australia, begins tooling up to make the bodies. These would be identical to the prototypes. (Body number one, painted black, did not become pilot car number one). Also work begins on the engine assembly line at Fishermans Bend.
 1 September, the decision is made to call the car Holden.
 25 September, engine number 1001 is started up.
 30 September, pilot car number one is completed in the evening. (There was no celebration, as GMH did not designate this vehicle as No. 1 Holden—it came to be known as Old Number One).
 19 October, pilot car number one is registered as MG-501.

Production overview 
All four Holden colours were represented:

These ten cars were used for testing. Three of them went to the Engineering Department, five went to Manufacturing, one went to the General Sales Manager, and one went to the managing director, H.E. Bettle.

Volume production 
When all departments were satisfied with the car, volume production began. The race was now on to ensure Holden dealers in all states had cars on their showroom floors before unveiling day. Black bodies dominated the early roll-out but GMH made sure that each capital city also received examples of cream, blue, and grey. Ultimately, 68 Holdens were distributed to the capital cities before unveiling day.

On Sunday, 21 November, an Open Day was held to exhibit the entire factory (including the high-security design rooms) and the car itself. But this special preview was not for the public or the dealers—it was for the Fishermans Bend employees and their families (GMH estimated that 12,000 guests attended). There were partly assembled cars at various stages along the assembly line as well as finished cars for the guests to inspect.

The official launch for Victorian dealers was held at the Oriental Hotel in Melbourne on Friday, 26 November.

Unveiling 

The official unveiling by Prime Minister Ben Chifley commenced at 2:30 pm on Monday, 29 November 1948, in the Fishermans Bend Social Hall. The 400 guests applauded when silver curtains parted to reveal a cream Holden, in a black velvet setting and sparkling under spotlights, as an orchestra played Brahms' Waltz in A-flat. The celebrations at the plant were attended by 1,200 official guests. The Holden was released for sale to the public at Port Melbourne, Victoria. The car was marketed simply as the Holden, without a model name. It had a  cast-iron straight six engine which produced , connected to a three-speed manual transmission. It managed the  sprint in 18.7 or 27.7 seconds. Sources differ. It also had a dust proof body, and a small 37 ft turning circle.

The 50-2106 coupe utility, based on the 48-215 sedan, was released in January 1951 and in July 1953 the Holden "Business Sedan", essentially a taxi version of the 48-215, was added to the range. The 48-215 and 50-2106 models were replaced by the Holden FJ series in 1953.

References

External links 
 Holden 48-215 sales brochure Retrieved from Unique Cars and Parts on 15 September 2008
 Holden Prototype Car No. 1 at the National Museum of Australia
 1949 Model 48/215 Holden sedan at the National Museum of Australia

First car made by manufacturer
48-215
Cars introduced in 1948
1950s cars